Grand Avenue Bridge may refer to: 
Grand Avenue Bridge (Chicago, Illinois), a movable bridge over the North Branch of the Chicago River
Grand Avenue Bridge (Des Moines, Iowa), a non-contributing structure in the Civic Center Historic District
Grand Avenue Bridge (Glenwood Springs, Colorado) which carries Colorado State Highway 82 over the Colorado River
Grand Avenue Bridge (Neillsville, Wisconsin) which was on the list of bridges on the National Register of Historic Places in Wisconsin until demolished in 1985
Grand Avenue Bridge (Spencer, Iowa), a renovated bridge that is part of the city's cultural district
Grand Avenue Swing Bridge (New Haven, Connecticut), a contributing structure to the Quinnipiac River Historic District

See also 
Grand Street Bridge, a movable bridge over Newtown Creek in Brooklyn and Queens, New York
Grand Street Bridge, a former bridge over the Pequonnock River in Bridgeport, Connecticut